Nexus Vijaya Mall is a shopping mall located in Vadapalani, Chennai, Tamil Nadu, India, developed by Prestige Group. This mall has approx 650,000 square feet of retail space. More than 100 shops occupy its four floors. This mall distinguishes itself by being local by housing Chennai-based brands in the mall such as Spar Hypermarket, RmKV, Lifestyle, Max, Westside, Fab India and Via South. It is also home to PVR Cinemas' Palazzo multiplex and an IMAX screen as well.

Shops

In terms of shops, each floor has been categorized such as ground floor for formal wear, first floor for casual & ethnic wear, second floor for Electronic and Travel and third floor for cinemas and food court . Some of the branded shops in the mall are Lifestyle, Park Avenue, Louis Philipe, Arrow, Ruosh, Basics, Levi, Hidesign, Reebok, Nike, Adidas, Puma, Wildcraft, Soch, Indian Terrain,  W, Jockey, Melange, Kalanikethan,  Funskool, Van Heusen, Manyavar, US Polo Assn, UCB, Colorplus, Firstcry.com, Mothercare, HP, Lenovo, VIP, Witco, Bata, Gini&Jony.

More important Shop

Casio
Via South
Zebronics
Skechers
Sony
Vivo
Poorvika
ID
Mochi
Peter England
The Arvind Store
Veneto
Max
Biba
Flying machine
Global Desi
Health & Glow
IMAX
Nalli
RmKV
Galito's
SALT restaurant
Food Court
KFC restaurant
Femiga
Spar Hypermarket
PVR Palazzo
Zimson
Trends Women
House of Candy
ACT Fibernet
Fun City
Hamleys
Westside
McDonald's
Limelite
L'OREAL
Sneakers
Kerastase Paris

Entertainment
 This mall houses an 09-screens multiplex from PVR Cinemas titled PVR Palazzo and also one IMAX screen, the second in the city.
 Fun city a gaming and entertainment zone for kids located at level 3 and 4.
Forum Express, Kiddie Rides, VR Games etc.

Food and dining
Nexus Mall's food court named as Via South indicates that most of the food stalls here have southern blend into their food. This food court has an 650-seat capacity, and major F&B's like KFC, McDonald's, Junior Kuppanna, Galito's, Taco Bell, Burger King, Beijing Bites, Tuk Tuk, Dosa & co, Wow! Momo, Pandikadai, Arabian Hut, Vasanta Bhavan, Amaravathi, Tibbs Frankie, Ibaco, Squeez Juice Bars, Ibakes, Sandwich Square, Madras Coffee House, Domino's Pizza, Cookieman, Krispy Kreme, Cafe Coffee Day, Kalmane Koffees, Salt restaurant, Cream & Fudge, Subway, Bombaysthan, The Belgian Waffle Co, The pasta bar Venetto, ID, Cream centre are located in Nexus Vijaya mall.

Amenities
Info-desk
First aid
Wheelchairs
Reserved parking for differently abled and mothers to be
Restroom for differently abled
Babycare room
Baby prams
Cab station
Lost & Found
Car spa
ATM's
Free Wi-fi
Prayer room
Bike Spa
Premium Parking
Bag & Shoe repair

List of companies
List of companies situated in Prestige center court, Nexus Vijaya mall. 
Isuzu Motors India Pvt Ltd
Comodo Security Solutions Pvt Ltd
Medusind Solutions
	Fever 91.9FM 8th floor
	Kone-9th floor
Expeditors-10th floor
Numeric - 10th floor
 LEGRAND - 10th floor

References

Shopping malls in Chennai
Shopping malls established in 2013
2013 establishments in Tamil Nadu